Achaetomium is a genus of fungi within the Chaetomiaceae family.

Species
As accepted by Species Fungorum;

 Achaetomium brevissimum 
 Achaetomium globosum 
 Achaetomium indicum 
 Achaetomium lippiae 
 Achaetomium macrocarpum 
 Achaetomium macrosporum 
 Achaetomium marinum 
 Achaetomium raii 
 Achaetomium sphaerocarpum 
 Achaetomium sulphureum 
 Achaetomium thermophilum 
 Achaetomium umbonatum 
 Achaetomium variosporum 

Former species; (all in family Chaetomiaceae)
 A. cristalliferum  = Chaetomium strumarium 
 A. fusisporum  = Achaetomium macrosporum 
 A. hamadae  = Pseudothielavia hamadae 
 A. indicum  = Achaetomium raii 
 A. irregulare  = Subramaniula flavipila 
 A. luteum  = Chaetomium luteum 
 A. nepalense  = Chaetomium nepalense 
 A. purpurascens  = Chaetomium purpurascens 
 A. strumarium  = Chaetomium strumarium 
 A. thielavioides  = Subramaniula thielavioides 
 A. thielavioides var. microsporum  = Subramaniula thielavioides 
 A. uniapiculatum  = Chaetomium uniapiculatum

References

External links
Achaetomium at Index Fungorum

Sordariales